Nocha is a village development committee in Morang District in Province No. 1 of North-eastern Nepal. At the time of the 1991 Nepal census it had a population of 2742 people living in 549 individual households.

References

Village development committees in Morang District
Dhanpalthan Rural Municipality